The Petal School District is a public school district based in Petal, Mississippi (USA).
In 1976, the Petal Schools District was formed after the community decided that it wanted the local school system to be separate from the county school system.

It includes Petal and the Forrest County portion of Eastabuchie.

Schools
Petal High School (Grades 9-12)
2007 National Blue Ribbon School
Petal Middle School (Grades 7-8)
Petal Upper Elementary School (formerly W.L. Smith) (Grades 5-6)
Petal Elementary School (Grades 3-4)
Petal Primary School (Grades K-2)

Sports 
The Petal School District participates in many different sports: football, soccer, archery, baseball, basketball, golf, and softball. Here is a complete list of all the teams that are at the Petal School district: 

 High School Archery  
 Middle School Archery  
 8th Grade (M.S.) Baseball  
 Freshman Baseball  
 JV Baseball  
 Varsity Baseball  
 Boys 7th Grade (M.S.) Basketball  
 Boys 8th Grade (M.S.) Basketball  
 Boys Varsity Basketball  
 Girls Middle School Basketball  
 Girls Varsity Basketball  
 Varsity Bowling  
 Middle School Cheerleading  
 Varsity Cheerleading  
 Varsity Cross Country  
 Boys 7th Grade (M.S.) Football  
 Boys 8th Grade (M.S.) Football  
 Boys Freshman Football  
 Boys Varsity Football  
 Co-Ed Varsity Golf  
 Co-Ed Showchoir
 Girls Showchoir
 Boys Soccer  
 Girls Soccer  
 Girls Varsity Softball  
 Girls Varsity Softball - Slow Pitch  
 Sports Medicine  
 Varsity Swimming  
 Co-Ed Varsity Tennis  
 Boys Middle School Track  
 Boys Varsity Track  
 Girls Middle School Track  
 Girls Varsity Track  
 Girls Middle School Volleyball  
 Girls Varsity Volleyball  
 Boys Varsity Weightlifting

Demographics

2006-07 school year
ite, 1.55% Hispanic, 0.59% Asian, and 0.08% Native American. 35.7% of the district's students were eligible to receive free lunch.

Previous school years

Accountability statistics

See also
List of school districts in Mississippi

References

External links
Petal School District

Education in Forrest County, Mississippi
School districts in Mississippi
School districts established in 1976